is a syllable in Javanese script that represents the sound /ɖɔ/, /ɖa/. It is transliterated to Latin as "dha", and sometimes in Indonesian orthography as "dho".

Pasangan 
Its pasangan form , is located on the bottom side of the previous syllable.

Murda 
The letter ꦝ doesn't have a murda form.

Mahaprana
Mahaprana letters were originally aspirated consonants used in Sanskrit and Kawi transliterations. However, there are no aspirated consonants in modern Javanese. 

Glyphs

Unicode block 

Javanese script was added to the Unicode Standard in October, 2009 with the release of version 5.2.

References 

Javanese script